Nodopelagia is a genus of sea snails, marine gastropod mollusks in the family Fasciolariidae, the spindle snails, the tulip snails and their allies.

Species
Species within the genus Nodopelagia include:
 Nodopelagia brazieri (Angas, 1877)

References

Fasciolariidae